Streptomyces wuyuanensis is a bacterium species from the genus of Streptomyces which has been isolated from a saline sample from the Inner Mongolia in China.

See also 
 List of Streptomyces species

References

Further reading

External links
Type strain of Streptomyces wuyuanensis at BacDive – the Bacterial Diversity Metadatabase

wuyuanensis
Bacteria described in 2013